Balanas is a surname. Notable people with the surname include:

Kristine Balanas (born 1990), Latvian violinist
Margarita Balanas (born 1993), Latvian cellist